SNARE-associated protein Snapin is a protein that in humans is encoded by the SNAPIN gene.

Function 

SNAPAP is a component of the SNARE complex of proteins that is required for synaptic vesicle docking and fusion. SNAPAP is also a component of the ubiquitously expressed BLOC1 multisubunit protein complex. BLOC1 is required for normal biogenesis of specialized organelles of the endosomal-lysosomal system, such as melanosomes and platelet dense granules.

Snapin has been established to be a promoter of vesicle docking, as it plays a role in binding to SNAP-25, which together stabilize and favor SNARE complex assembly and vesicle docking. Specifically, the degree to which snapin is necessary for proper synaptic release varies across species. The functions of snapin have been reported to be independent of synaptotagmin, and works through the SNAP-25 pathway to stabilize, prime, and dock vesicles.

Interactions 

SNAPAP has been shown to interact with:

 BLOC1S1, 
 BLOC1S2, 
 Dysbindin, 
 PLDN, 
 RGS7,
 SNAP-25,
 SNAP23,  and
 TRPV1.

References

Further reading